The Maria Lenk Aquatics Centre is an aquatics centre that is part of the City of Sports Complex in the Barra da Tijuca district of Rio de Janeiro, Brazil. It is part of the investments made by the city to host the swimming, synchronized swimming and diving competitions of the 2007 Pan American Games. During the 2016 Summer Olympics, it hosted group matches of water polo and the synchronised swimming and diving competitions. The name of the water park is a tribute to the Brazilian swimmer, Maria Lenk, who died less than three months before its inauguration.

The water park was designed in accordance with established parameters and specifications of the International Swimming Federation (FINA). It is partially covered and includes an Olympic-sized swimming pool, an indoor heating and a tank for diving.

The complex has the capacity to receive about 8,000 people. The facility has also been designed according to the specifications required to achieve the Parapan American Games of 2007, as well as environments and equipment ready to receive people with special needs.

In March 2008, the facility came under the administration of the Brazilian Olympic Committee, which has been involved in training for Olympic and Paralympic athletes, coaches and officials, as well as courses, conferences, workshops, gym and small schools of swimming, water polo, diving and synchronized swimming. Until 2009, the BOC did not do any sports activity on the site.

The park, as well as other facilities built for the achievement of the Pan American Games, was one of the major assets of the city's bid for the 2016 Summer Olympics. The aquatics centre was intended to be adapted into community facilities in Madureira Park and the Campo Grande area. In February 2017, a reporter commented that the aquatics centre had become a white elephant, abandoned and left to crumble, less than a year after the games.

See also 
 Júlio Delamare Aquatics Centre
 Swimming Olympic Centre of Bahia

References

External links
Rio 2016 website
Rio2016.org.br Bid package. Volume 2. p. 18.

Venues of the 2016 Summer Olympics
Barra Olympic Park
Olympic diving venues
Olympic water polo venues
Sports venues in Rio de Janeiro (city)
Swimming venues in Brazil